Hypomyces chrysospermus, the bolete eater, is a parasitic ascomycete fungus that grows on bolete mushrooms, turning the afflicted host a whitish, golden yellow, or tan color.  It is found in Eurasia and North America, as well as southwest Western Australia. Unlike the related Lobster mushroom, H. lactifluorum, the bolete eater and its afflicted host mushrooms are inedible.

Taxonomy
Hypomyces chrysospermus was first described by French mycologists, brothers Louis René and Charles Tulasne in 1860. Common names include bolete eater, and bolete mould.

The bolete eater belongs to a genus of parasitic ascomycetes, each of which infects differing genera of fungi. For example, H. lactifluorum attacks mushrooms of the family Russulaceae, H. copletus and H. transformans infect Suillus species, H. melanocarpus prefers Tylopilus species, while other Hypomyces have a much broader host range.

Description

The bolete eater infects boletes, initially with a thin whitish layer which then becomes golden and finally a reddish-brown pimpled appearance. The bolete's flesh softens and is putrescent by the third stage. Single or multiple boletes may be infected, members of Paxillus and Rhizopogon are also attacked.

The spores are oval-shaped and smooth in the white stage and measure 10–30 by 5–12 μm, and are warty, round and thicker-walled in the yellow stage and are 10–25 μm in diameter. These two stages are asexual, while the final stage is sexual; here the spores are spindle-shaped and measure 25–30 by 5–6 μm.

Distribution and habitat
Hypomyces chrysospermus is found in North America, and Europe, where it is common. It is common in the southwest of Western Australia, where it is found in forest and coastal plant communities.  It is also found in the Eastern Chinese provinces of Hebei, Jiangsu, Anhui, and Fujian.

Usage
As mentioned earlier, H. chrysospermus is not edible and may be poisonous.  The bolete eater is used in Chinese herbal medicine to stop and heal external bleeding, primarily through direct, topical application of the spore onto open wounds or cuts.

References

Fungi described in 1860
Hypocreaceae
Inedible fungi
Parasitic fungi
Taxa named by Edmond Tulasne